Oscar Pastor may refer to:

 Oscar Rolando Cantuarias Pastor (1931–2011), Roman Catholic archbishop of Piura, Peru
 Óscar Pastor (computer scientist) (born 1962), Spanish computer scientist